Rupaha is a village in Sri Lanka. It is located within Central Province, in Walapane divisional Secretariat.

See also
List of towns in Central Province, Sri Lanka

External links

Populated places in Nuwara Eliya District